Wine Cork Stonehenge is a 2018 EP by American rock group Guided by Voices. It was released on December 7, 2018, with another Guided By Voices EP, 100 Dougs.

Track listing
Side A:
 "My Angel" - 1:27
 "The Stars Behind Us" - 1:22
 "Skull Arrow" - 1:05

Side B:
 "Thimble Society" - 1:39
 "Tiny Apes" - 1:07
 "The Pipers, the Vipers, the Snakes!" - 1:49

External links 
 Wine Cork Stonehenge on Guided By Voices' Database

2018 EPs
Guided by Voices EPs